Kill Fuck Die (also stylized as Kill.Fuck.Die. and abbreviated as K.F.D.) is the seventh studio album by American heavy metal band W.A.S.P., released by Castle Records in 1997.

It differs from their previous releases by incorporating an industrial and more aggressive sound. Guitarist Chris Holmes rejoined the band for this album in a surprise move. According to lead singer Blackie Lawless, he and Holmes had just come out of bad relationships and this is reflected on the album. According to Lawless the record was also inspired by the film Apocalypse Now.

Lawless described the record as "snuff rock" in a video press kit promoting the album. Subsequently, the accompanying tour featured a highly transgressive stage show in which Lawless performed mock rapes of a crucified nun as well as chainsaw decapitations of live pigs.

It has often been cited that this album is also another concept piece (like The Crimson Idol), as it refers to many issues of relationships and pain and also has a rough story alongside all the tracks that seem to run together, however this has never been confirmed by Lawless or the rest of the band.

Track listing
All songs written by Blackie Lawless and Chris Holmes.

 The Japanese version of the CD does not include the tracks "Fetus" or "Little Death", but includes the Japan-only bonus track "Tokyo's on Fire".

Personnel
W.A.S.P.
 Blackie Lawless – lead vocals, guitar, producer
 Chris Holmes – lead guitar
 Stet Howland – drums, vocals
 Mike Duda – bass, vocals

Production
Mikey Davis – engineer, mixing

Charts

References

External links
Interview about K.F.D.

W.A.S.P. albums
1997 albums
Albums produced by Blackie Lawless
Castle Communications albums